Refulgence may refer to:
Refulgence, 2011 album by Epignosis
Divine refulgence